Actinopolyspora xinjiangensis is a halophilic, filamentous actinobacterium. It is aerobic and Gram-positive, with type strain TRM 40136(T) (=CCTCC AA 209080(T) = KCTC 19656(T)).

References

Further reading
Issues in Physiology, Cell Biology, and Molecular Medicine: 2011 Edition, ScholarlyEditions, Jan 9, 2012 - 922 pages.

External links

LPSN
Type strain of Actinopolyspora xinjiangensis at BacDive -  the Bacterial Diversity Metadatabase

Actinomycetia
Bacteria described in 2011
Halophiles